Mont Caro or Caro is the highest mountain of the Ports de Tortosa-Beseit, Catalonia, Spain.

Geography
It has an elevation of 1,441 metres above sea level. There are two large antennas and a Virgin Mary shrine on top of the summit.

This mountain is often covered with snow in the winter.

See also
Ports de Tortosa-Beseit
Mountains of Catalonia
Iberian System

References

Mountains of Catalonia
Ports de Tortosa-Beseit
Emblematic summits of Catalonia